Hypselodoris alboterminata is a species of sea slug or dorid nudibranch, a marine gastropod mollusk in the family Chromodorididae.

Distribution
This nudibranch is known only from the Hawaiian islands in the central Pacific Ocean.

Description
Hypselodoris alboterminata has a yellow to white body with 2 to 3 pinkish-purple longitudinal lines running along its body and upper dorsum. The anterior and posterior ends of the mantle are marked with white spots. The gills and rhinophores are white, lined with red bands or stripes.

This species can reach a total length of at least 15 mm.

References

Chromodorididae
Gastropods described in 1999